Tirana Military Hospital (Shqip: "Spitali Amerikan" / Spitali Universitar i Traumës)
is a military hospital in Tirana, Albania founded on September 26, 1929. During the Kosovo War it was used extensively in the treatment of wounded soldiers.

See also
Mother Teresa Hospital (Tirana)
2008 Gërdec explosions
Qafa e Vishës bus tragedy

References

Hospitals in Albania
Buildings and structures in Tirana
Hospitals established in 1993